Helt may refer to:-

Helt Township, Vermillion County, Indiana

People with the name
Cheri Helt, United States politician from Oregon
John Helt, Danish soccer player